Lytorhynchus kennedyi or (also known as Kennedy's leafnose snake) is a non-venomous snake found in Middle East.

Description 
Lytorhynchus kennedyi or (Lytorhynchus diadema kennedyi), adults range from 30-51 cm in length. 

Bright orange to reddish, with dark transverse on the body and the tail.

Distribution 
Syria, Jordan, probably in SW Iraq (Type locality: Syria, between Horns and Palmyra).

This species is found in sandy desert, semi-desert, sandy coastal areas, areas of high grassland plateaus (especially those close to rocky areas), and clay plateaus with rocks. This species digs, but is not considered fossorial In Arabia it appears to  occur in a wide range of dry habitats.

Feed 
Feeds mainly on lizards but will eat large arthropods and insects and young rodents.

Reproduction 
Oviparous, The female lays clutches of three to five eggs.

References 

Colubrids
Reptiles of the Middle East